James Albert Myers (April 8, 1874 – October 12, 1915) was an American professional baseball player who played in parts of three seasons for the St. Louis Browns, Washington Senators and Philadelphia Phillies.
He was born in Frederick, Maryland, and died in Washington, D.C., at the age of 41.

External links

Major League Baseball third basemen
St. Louis Browns players
Washington Senators (1891–1899) players
Philadelphia Phillies players
Baseball players from Maryland
1874 births
1915 deaths
Sportspeople from Frederick, Maryland
19th-century baseball players
Petersburg Farmers players
Altoona Mad Turtles players
Nashville Seraphs players
Milwaukee Brewers (minor league) players
Springfield Ponies players
Hartford Indians players
Wooden Nutmegs players
Syracuse Stars (minor league baseball) players
Toledo Mud Hens players
Chattanooga Lookouts players